Ijebu-jesa is the capital of Oriade Local Government area in Osun State of Nigeria.

It is  a commuter city with connections to Ekiti State on one side, Ondo State on another and it has a border with the famous Ilesa the surrounding towns area Iwoye-jesa, Iloko-jesa, Ere and Ijeda.

This city also serves as the main route to the Osun State College of Technology in Esa-Oke. This city also has a private polytechnic in Ijebu-Jesa road approved by the national board for technical education (NBTE) Nigeria.

Ijebu-jesa which hitherto before now was known and called Ijebu Egboro is the ancient historic town in the east of Osun State, Nigeria occupies a strategic position in Ijesaland. In Ijesa division, it is the next most important town politically and in term of history . Her Oba is the next to the Owa Obokun of Ijesaland.

The town is situated eight kilometers north of Ilesa and about 128 kilometers east of Ibadan. It lies approximately on latitude 7.45 degrees north within the rain forest belt and so offers opportunity for farming on a large scale. The people are the core of Ijesa and are noted for their dogged industry.

Ijebu jesa was founded by Oba Agigiri Egboroganlada (first Onijebu Egboro) - a son of Oodua Olofin Aiye who was also an elder brother of Owa Obokun Ajibogun.

Agigiri means “the battle or war waves hot (A de k’ogun gbona girigiri)”. Ajibogun is interpreted as one who meet war (Ade ba ogun). Both Agigiri and Ajibogun were brought up by their grandmother known as Ijasin at Ilode in Ile Ife as twin brothers.

Legends have it that Ajibogun and Agigiri were very close during their lifetime. When their father was becoming old he became blind. The Ifa worshippers consulted the oracle and it was revealed that he would regain his sight if certain ingredients including sea-water and the pod of palm kernels could be procured. Ajibogun and his brother Agigiri went for the sea-water through Ijebu-Ode and got it from Eleke near Epe where the Awujale of Ijebuland then Obanita, worshipped the sea annually, the brothers collected the water and brought it home to Ile-Ife. Their father was treated and he regained his sight.

Founding of Ijebu-Jesa 

On their return, they found that all their other brothers had left Ile-Ife to found and establish their different kingdoms, Ajibogun and Agigiri followed suit, they are accompanied by a large entourage including fifty specially selected people. Historians are divided on the routes taken, One of such routes described took them from Oniyangi in Ile-Ife, through many places like Ita Ijero, Ile-Ido, Igbadae, Igbo Owaluse on Iwara road, after many years they came to Ibokun. Other historians gave scanty account of their route, they wrote that the two brothers departed Ile-Ife with their beaded crowns near Ilowa. Ajibogun and his entourage  passed through Ipole and finally settled in Ilesha while Agigiri and his entourage journeyed from Ibokun and finally settled in Ijebu Jesa under the shade of a large tree with big shady leaves (ewe ti o gboro) this tree was later recognised as 'Iroko Oja'. He named the settlement Egboro, other historians claimed he named the settlement Ijebu in reference to the role played by Agigiri and Ajibogun in fetching sea water for the restoration of their father's sight: A jo lo bu omi okun, Ajo'bu, through long time usage, coinage and twisting of tongues, the words later came to be known and called Ijebu, because Ijebu lies within Ijeshaland, it came to be known as Ijebu-Jesa.

Traditional local administration 

In Yorubaland as soon as a town is established, a traditional local administration is put in place; The Oba and his chiefs who would be helping the Oba would be chosen, women are not left out as some of them are made chiefs who are members of the Oba's cabinet.

The Traditional Ruler in Ijebu-Jesa is called the Elegboro Of Ijebu-Jesa. The current Monarch is Oba (Engr.) Moses Oluwafemi Agunsoye, Abikehin Ekun, Agunsoye II

The Traditional Setting
There are five ruling houses in Ijebu Jesa:

i.   Ajifolokun
ii.  Ajigiteri
iii. Ida-Ekun/Atobatele
iv.  Nibayo/Laguna
v.   Ogbaruku/Akoko-ahun

Within limits of available records 23 Obas have reigned:

1. Agigiri   
2. Ida-Ekun.  
3. Edun-Ide   
4. Ajigiteri   
5. Ayapaki-Efon   
6. Oriasinwi 
7. Ajifolokun   
8. Ogbaruku (Kiriji war-time) 
9. Ariyanloye                  
10. Agunsoye  
11. Ariabon  
12. Atobatele  
13. Erinfolajura    
14. Arojojoye I  
15. Abon  
16. Amolese   
17. Laguna   
18. Arojojoye II 
19. Ajifolokun Palmer (1974–1996) 
20. Barrister Aribisala Ajigiteri (1996-2017)   
21. Oba (Engr.) Moses Oluwafemi Agunsoye, Abikehin Ekun, Agunsoye II (2017-till date)

References

External links
  Ijebu-jesa Foundation
 
 

Osun State